Valter Borges dos Santos (16 October 1954  – 24 December 2013)  was a Brazilian actor and voice actor, best known for his work in television, specifically his role as the slave overseer Bruno in the 1986 TV drama serie Sinhá Moça (Little Missy) and as Colonel Werneck in the TV miniseries O Brado Retumbante (2012).

Career
Santos studied at the National Conservatory Theatre in Rio de Janeiro. Acted in several plays, such as "Hair" and "The Week" for which he was awarded by APCA. He was also present in TV series like " O Fim do Mundo ", " O Salvador da Pátria ", " O Outro ", "Sinha Girl", "Roque Santeiro" (1975  and 1985 ) and in mini series like " Amazônia - De Galvez a Chico Mendes ", "Abolição", " República ", and "Grande Sertão Veredas".
He also made voiceovers for the Brazilian version of "Knights of the Zodiac" as Jamian Crow and Camus of Aquarius.
He appeared in film movies like " Deixa, Amorzinho...Deixa " (1975), " Mulheres do Cais" (1979) and " O Menino da Porteira " (2009).
His last major role was as Colonel Werneck in 2012, before he directed and eventually narrated episodes of National Geographic Society in 2013 in Portuguese.

Death
Valter Santos died on December 24, 2013, of a sudden heart attack.

Work

1975: Roque Santeiro (TV Series) .... Luizão
1975: Deixa, Amorzinho...Deixa
1977: Um Sol Maior (TV Series) .... Sala (Salatiel Jr.)
1978: O Direito de Nascer (TV Series) .... priest
1978: Aritana (TV Series) .... Ramalho
1978: João Brasileiro, o Bom Baiano (TV Series) .... Glauco
1979: Mulheres do Cais .... Dante
1980: Cavalo Amarelo (TV Series) .... Alemão
1981: Rosa Baiana (TV Series)
1982: Pic Nic Classe C (TV Series) .... Mauro
1982: Destino (TV Series) .... Seu Apolônio
1982: A Leoa (TV Series) .... Hugo
1983: A Ponte do Amor (TV Series)
1985: Roque Santeiro (TV Series) .... gunman
1985: Grande Sertão: Veredas (TV Mini-Series) .... Alaripe
1986: Sinhá Moça (TV Series) .... overseer Bruno
1987: O Outro (TV Series) .... Melo Mendonça
1988: Abolição (TV Mini-Series) .... José do Patrocínio
1989: O Salvador da Pátria (TV Series) .... Jaime
1989: República (TV Mini-Series) .... José do Patrocínio
1990: Pantanal (TV Series) .... Matador
1994: 74.5 - Uma Onda no Ar (TV Series) .... Stallone
1994: Knights of the Zodiac (TV Series) .... Jamian de Corvo and Camus de Aquário
1996: O Fim do Mundo (TV Series) .... Juvenal
1997: Mandacaru (TV Series) .... Avelós
2000: Marcas da Paixão (TV Series) .... Valtinho
2001: Amor e Ódio (TV Series) .... Ezequiel
2006: Cidadão Brasileiro (TV Series) .... Décio Leão
2007: Amazônia - De Galvez a Chico Mendes (TV Series) .... Nilo
2009: O Menino da Porteira .... João Só
2010: Força Tarefa (TV Series) .... Colonel Lucena
2012: O Brado Retumbante (TV Mini-Series) .... Colonel Werneck
2014: ABCs of Death 2 .... (segment "J") (final film role)

References

1954 births
2013 deaths
Brazilian male telenovela actors
Brazilian male stage actors
Brazilian male film actors
Brazilian male television actors
Male actors from Rio de Janeiro (city)
Brazilian male voice actors
20th-century Brazilian male actors
21st-century Brazilian male actors